Ryōsuke, Ryosuke, Ryousuke or Ryohsuke (written: , , , ,  or  in hiragana) is a Japanese masculine given name. Notable people with the name include:

, Japanese artistic gymnast
, Japanese artistic gymnast
 Ryōsuke Hashiguchi (born 1962), Japanese film director
 Ryosuke Hashimoto (born 1993), Japanese idol singer (A.B.C-Z)
 Ryōsuke Ishizu (1907–1986), Japanese photographer
 Ryosuke Iwasa (born 1989), Japanese boxer
 Ryōsuke Kagawa (1896–1987), Japanese actor
, Japanese footballer
, Japanese professional baseball player
 Kuroda Kiyotaka a.k.a. Kuroda Ryōsuke (1907–1986), Japanese politician
, Japanese footballer
, Japanese shogi player
, Japanese footballer and manager
, Japanese speed skater
, Japanese handball player
Ryosuke Shimizu (born 1980), Japanese karateka
 Ryōsuke Takahashi (born 1943), Japanese anime director
 Ryōsuke Tei (born 1965), Japanese animator
, Japanese speed skater
 Ryosuke Yamada (born 1993), Japanese idol, singer and actor
Ryosuke Yamamoto (disambiguation), multiple people

Japanese masculine given names